Al-Qalam University, Katsina (AUK), formerly known as Katsina University, Katsina (KUK) is located in Dutsinma Road, Katsina State. Established in 2005, it is the first private Islamic institution in Nigeria.

The University currently runs six schools/colleges: The College of Social and Management Sciences, College of Natural and Applied Sciences, College of Education, College of Humanities, College of Post Graduate Studies, and School of Basic and Remedial Studies. It awards 22 undergraduate degrees (among which five courses offer both full-time and part-time programs), 11 master's programs, and nine PhD programmes, all accredited by the National Universities Commission (NUC). The programs of study in the university are as follows:

College of Humanities

 B.A. Hausa language
 B.A. Arabic
 B.A. English language
 B.A. Islamic studies

College of Natural & Applied Sciences

 BSc. Biological science
 BSc. Chemistry
 BSc. Physics
 BSc. Mathematics
 BSc. Computer science

College of Education

 B.A./Ed Arabic
 B.A./Ed Hausa
 B.A./Ed Islamic Studies
 B.A./Ed English Language
 B.A./Ed Mathematics
 B.A./Ed Physics
 B.A./Ed Chemistry
 B.A./Ed Biology
 B.A./Ed Geography

College of Social & Management Sciences

 BSc. Accounting (part-time and full-time)
 BSc. Business administration (part-time and full-time)
 BSc. Economics (part-time and full-time)
 BSc. Political science (part-time and full-time)
 BSc. Sociology (part-time and full-time)

College of Post Graduate Studies

 M.A. Arabic
 M.A. Islamic Studies
 M.A. English
 MBA
 MSc. Accounting
 MSc. Business Administration
 MSc. Computer Science
 MSc. Economics
 MSc. Mathematics
 MSc. Political Science
 MSc. Sociology
 Ph.D Accounting
 Ph.D Arabic
 Ph.D Business Administration
 Ph.D Computer Science
 Ph.D Economics
 Ph.D English
 Ph.D Islamic Studies
 Ph.D Mathematics
 Ph.D Political Science

School of Basic & Remedial Studies

 Remedial
 IJMB
 Pre-Degree

References

External links 
Al-qalam University, Katsina Official Website
Universities in Nigeria

Universities and colleges in Nigeria
Katsina State
2005 establishments in Nigeria
Educational institutions established in 2005
Islamic universities and colleges in Nigeria